The Scuppernong River is a tributary of the Bark River,  long, in southeastern Wisconsin in the United States. Via the Bark and Rock rivers, it is part of the watershed of the Mississippi River. It rises in southwestern Waukesha County and flows generally westwardly into Jefferson County, past the village of Palmyra.

The U.S. Board on Geographic Names settled on "Scuppernong River" as the stream's name in 1906.  According to the Geographic Names Information System, it has also been known historically as "Schupernong River", "Scupernong River", and "Scuppernong Creek."

According to the Wisconsin Department of Natural Resources, the name Scuppernong comes from a Ho-Chunk word meaning “sweet-scented land.”

See also
List of Wisconsin rivers

References

Columbia Gazetteer of North America entry
DeLorme (1992).  Wisconsin Atlas & Gazetteer.  Freeport, Maine: DeLorme.  .

Rivers of Wisconsin
Rivers of Jefferson County, Wisconsin
Rivers of Waukesha County, Wisconsin